Mitchell Islam (born January 24, 1990) is a Canadian former competitive ice dancer. He teamed up with partner Alexandra Paul in 2009. They are the 2010 World Junior silver medalists, 2013 Nebelhorn Trophy bronze medalists, and three-time Canadian national bronze medalists (2011, 2014, 2015). They competed at the 2014 Winter Olympics.

Personal life 
Mitchell Islam was born on January 24, 1990, in Barrie, Ontario. His mother, Debbie, is a former ladies' singles skater who won the Canadian junior title and senior national bronze medal. She is also a figure skating judge; she was on the judging panel for the men's event at the 2010 Olympic Games in Vancouver. His father, David, is Director of Ice Dance at the Mariposa School of Skating. His sister, Rachel, competes in track and field. Mitchell Islam is currently an Ice Dance coach alongside his father, David Islam at the Mariposa School of Skating in Barrie. In his years after retirement as a coach, he has successfully coached many teams from the National to International level, such as most recent 2x Junior National Polish Champions and Junior Worlds competitors Olivia Oliver and Joshua Andari. Another one of Mitchell Islam's dance teams, Dana Sabatini-Speciale and Nicholas Buelow, among many other achievements, were recently crowned the 2022 Novice Canadian National Silver Medalists in Ottawa, Ontario.

Mitchell Islam has played AAA hockey, rep level lacrosse, and soccer. He studied political science at Oakland University, completing his final semester in April 2017.

Career

Early career 
From 2000 through 2008, Islam competed with Joanna Lenko. They trained at the Mariposa School of Skating, coached by Mitchell Islam's father, David.

In the 2006–07 ISU Junior Grand Prix season, Lenko/Islam were 5th in the Netherlands and won a silver medal in Hungary. After taking silver on the junior level at the 2007 Canadian Championships, they were assigned to the 2007 World Junior Championships but withdrew after the original dance due to Lenko's illness.

Lenko/Islam won a pair of medals in the 2007–08 ISU Junior Grand Prix — silver in the U.S. and bronze in Estonia — which qualified the team for the 2007 JGP Final. Health issues forced them to withdraw prior to the event. They were also unable to compete at the 2008 Canadian Championships, where they had intended to skate at the senior level for the first time. Despite missing the event, Skate Canada named them to the 2008 Junior World team. However, Lenko's health issues persisted, leaving them unable to compete at the event.

Partnership with Alexandra Paul 

In February 2009, Mitchell Islam had a successful tryout with Alexandra Paul, a fellow skater at the Mariposa School of Skating in Barrie, Ontario. His father was on his coaching team.

Paul/Islam began competing together during the 2009–2010 season. In July 2009, they beat the Canadian junior champions at the Minto Summer Skate and were given a Junior Grand Prix assignment. They competed at two 2009–10 JGP events, finishing fourth in Poland and fifth in Turkey. They won gold at the Canadian Junior Championships and were assigned to Junior Worlds where they captured the silver medal.

Paul/Islam moved up to the senior ranks for the 2010–2011 season. They finished fourth in their senior Grand Prix debut at 2010 Skate Canada International. Their next event was 2010 Cup of Russia. They had a fall in the short dance and withdrew from the free dance after Paul sustained a rib injury. Paul/Islam made their senior national debut at the 2011 Canadian Championships, finishing in third. They were first alternates for the 2011 World Championships.

His partner sprained her knee ligament around 2011 or 2012.

Paul/Islam finished eighth at the 2011 Skate America. They withdrew before the free dance at 2011 NHK Trophy after placing seventh in the short — Paul suffered a cut to the back of the thigh in a collision with Italy's Lorenza Alessandrini / Simone Vaturi during the morning practice on November 12.

In June 2012, Paul/Islam decided to train full-time at the Detroit Skating Club in Bloomfield Hills, Michigan. They had no Grand Prix events in 2012. At the 2013 Canadian Championships, they finished fourth.

Paul/Islam began the following season with bronze at the 2013 Nebelhorn Trophy. They placed fifth at their sole Grand Prix assignment, the 2013 Skate Canada International. After winning the bronze medal at the 2014 Canadian Championships, they were assigned to the 2014 Winter Olympics in Sochi, where they placed 18th.

Paul/Islam ranked 8th in the short dance, 14th in the free dance, and 13th overall at the 2015 World Championships in Shanghai, China. A few weeks later, they changed coaches, joining Marie-France Dubreuil, Patrice Lauzon, and Romain Haguenauer at the Gadbois Centre in Montreal, Quebec.

Paul injured her hamstring in the summer of 2016. She and Islam received the bronze medal at the 2016 CS U.S. International Classic. On November 18, Paul twisted her knee when she fell during a morning practice at the 2016 Cup of China. The duo decided to withdraw from the competition before the short dance. They announced their competitive retirement on December 15, 2016.

Programs

With Paul

With Lenko

Competitive highlights 
GP: Grand Prix; CS: Challenger Series; JGP: Junior Grand Prix

With Paul

With Lenko

References

External links 

 
 

1990 births
Canadian male ice dancers
Living people
World Junior Figure Skating Championships medalists
Figure skaters at the 2014 Winter Olympics
Olympic figure skaters of Canada
Skating people from Ontario
Sportspeople from Barrie
21st-century Canadian people